Artur Yusupov may refer to:

 Artur Yusupov (chess player) (born 1960), Russian chess player
 Artur Yusupov (footballer) (born 1989), Russian football player
 Artur Yusupov (fencer) (born 1983), Russian wheelchair fencer